Snellenia capnora is a species of moth of the Stathmopodidae family. It is found in Queensland, Australia.

References

Moths described in 1913
Stathmopodidae